Y. R. Meena or Yad Ram Meena (born: 1 July 1946) is an Indian Judge and the former Chief Justice of the Gujarat High Court.

Career
Justice Y.R. Meena was born in 1946. He passed B.A. LL.B. and enrolled as an advocate in 1968. He practised in Civil, Criminal and Revenue Matters, appointed a Law Officer of the Law Commission of India in 1973. Justice Meena was appointed Deputy Legislative Counsel and Additional Legislative Counsel in Ministry of Law and Justice, Delhi in 1976 and 1979 respectively. In 1980 he became a Member of Income Tax Appellate Tribunal. On 20 July 1990 he was appointed an additional Judge of Rajasthan High Court and transferred to Calcutta High Court in December 1997. In 2001 Meena was transferred to the Rajasthan High Court and took charge of the Acting Chief Justice since 2004. He  was a Patron in Chief of Rajasthan State Judicial academy. He was elevated in the post of the Chief Justice of High Court of Gujarat on 3 February 2007. Justice Meena retired on 30 June 2008 from the post. Madhu Koda, Former Chief Minister of Jharkhand appointed Meena as his legal advisor after his retirement.

References

Meena people
1946 births
Living people
Indian judges
Judges of the Calcutta High Court
Judges of the Rajasthan High Court
Chief Justices of the Gujarat High Court
21st-century Indian lawyers
21st-century Indian judges